Benjamin Pierce (December 25, 1757 – April 1, 1839) was an American soldier, farmer and politician who twice served as the governor of New Hampshire from 1827 to 1828 and from 1829 to 1830. Pierce fought during the American Revolutionary War before becoming a Democratic-Republican Party politician. He was the father of Franklin Pierce, the 14th president of the United States.

Biography
Pierce was born in Chelmsford in the Province of Massachusetts Bay, the son of Benjamin and Elizabeth Merrill Pierce, as well as a direct descendant of Thomas Pierce (1618–1683), the grandson of Sir Richard Carew, who was born in Norwich, Norfolk, England and settled in the Massachusetts Bay Colony. Benjamin Pierce was a distinguished veteran of the Revolutionary War, serving in the 16th Continental Regiment, which was later renamed the 8th Massachusetts Regiment. He was present at the Battle of Bunker Hill. He was promoted to Ensign in the 1st Massachusetts Regiment for bravery during the Saratoga campaign. He was an  original member of the Society of the Cincinnati. 

Following the war, he moved to Hillsborough, New Hampshire, where he built the Pierce family home, and was assigned the task of forming the Hillsborough County militia. In 1805, he was promoted to brigadier general and assigned command of the New Hampshire state militia. Prior to becoming governor, he served in the New Hampshire House of Representatives from 1786 to 1788 and twice as Sheriff of Hillsborough County, from 1809 to 1812 and later from 1818 to 1827. He was a delegate to the state Constitutional Convention in September 1791 and a member of the Governor's Council from 1803 to 1809 and again in 1814.

Family life
Pierce's father died when he was six. He subsequently worked on his uncle's farm until enlisting in Ebenezer Bridge's Massachusetts regiment on April 26, 1775.

On May 24, 1787, he married Elizabeth Andrews. Their daughter, named Elizabeth Andrews Pierce, was born August 9, 1788, but the elder Elizabeth died of childbirth complications four days later on August 13. Elizabeth Andrews Pierce (1788–1855) was the wife of United States Army General John McNeil Jr.

He married Anna Kendrick (born October 30, 1769) on February 1, 1790 at Amherst, New Hampshire. Together they had eight children:

Benjamin Kendrick Pierce (August 29, 1790 – April 1, 1850), he became a lieutenant colonel and commandant of Fort Mackinac in Michigan. He married Josette Laframboise, daughter of prominent fur trader Magdelaine Laframboise.
Nancy M. Pierce (November 2, 1792 – 1837)
John Sullivan Pierce (November 5, 1796 – September 28, 1824), a first lieutenant in the Army who served at Fort Mackinac and other posts in Michigan, and died in Detroit.
Harriet B. Pierce (1800–1837)
Charles Grandison Pierce (1803–1828)
Franklin Pierce (November 23, 1804 – October 8, 1869), 14th president of the United States
 Charlotte Pierce, d. in infancy.
Henry Dearborn Pierce (September 19, 1812 – 1880)

They were married until her death on December 7, 1838. He died 4 months later in Hillsborough, and is buried in the town's Pine Hill Cemetery.

Benjamin Pierce was an original member of the Society of the Cincinnati and served as vice president of the Massachusetts state society from 1836 to 1839. With membership inherited through primogeniture, Pierce's eldest son, Benjamin Kendrick Pierce, succeeded him. Benjamin K. Pierce died in 1850 and was succeeded by Franklin Pierce, the next eldest son of Benjamin Pierce. Franklin Pierce died in 1869 and was succeeded by Henry Dearborn Pierce, the youngest son of Benjamin Pierce. Henry Dearborn Pierce was succeeded by his son Kirk Dearborn Pierce, the grandson of Benjamin Pierce.

References

Sources

New Hampshire Division of Historical Resources Biography
Massachusetts Society of the Cincinnati Profiles online at the New England Historic Genealogical Society

External links
American Revolutionary War Hero – Benjamin Pierce 
Benjamin Pierce, National Governor's Association 

1757 births
1839 deaths
Democratic Party governors of New Hampshire
Democratic Party members of the New Hampshire House of Representatives
New Hampshire sheriffs
Franklin Pierce family
Fathers of presidents of the United States
People from Chelmsford, Massachusetts
American people of English descent
New Hampshire Democratic-Republicans
People from Hillsborough, New Hampshire
Continental Army officers from Massachusetts
Members of the Executive Council of New Hampshire
Democratic-Republican Party state governors of the United States